The Saurer 2DM is a truck model, which established by the Adolph Saurer AG at Arbon from in 1959. The payload of 4.9 tonnes, it is a right hand drive. The Swiss Army used the 2DM since 1964, in several special versions, such as dump trucks, snow plow or tanker for aircraft or tanks. Almost identical was the model Berna 2VM from Berna Olten. Starting in 1964, approx 3200 units were built in all different varieties. The 2DM was also sold for civilian purposes.

References
 Kurt Sahli, Jo Wiedmer: Saurer. Nutzfahrzeuge damals und heute. Buri, Bern 1983, .
militärfahrzeuge.ch Technical infos in German.
Fahrzeuge der Schweizer Armee by Markus Hofmann (2000)

External links

 Private Website

Military trucks of Switzerland
Off-road vehicles
Military vehicles introduced in the 1960s